Find Your Way is the debut album by English R&B singer Gabrielle. It was released in 1993 and features her UK number one single, "Dreams", along with three further UK Top 40 singles; "Going Nowhere", I Wish" and "Because of You". The album reached number 9 on the UK Albums Chart.

Track listing

Charts

Weekly charts

Year-end charts

Certifications

References

1993 debut albums
PolyGram albums
Go! Discs albums
Gabrielle (singer) albums